The Utilities Act 2000 is an Act of the Parliament of the United Kingdom that deals with the gas and electrical markets in the UK. It mainly modified the Gas Act 1986, the Gas Act 1995 and Electricity Act 1989. One of the greatest changes was that integrated electricity companies were required to have separate licences for each of their businesses such as supply or distribution. The act was originally supposed to deal with water and telecoms also but following industry pressure they were dropped.

Section 105 of the Act is intended to protect national security; it prohibits the disclosure of certain types of evidence relevant to the energy sector, with penalties of fines and up to two years' imprisonment for breaches. The section has been used by Ofgem to threaten whistleblowers informing their managers and the National Audit Office of misspends of millions of pounds. The Employment Appeal Tribunal found that the law  contravened the European Convention on Human Rights.

See also
UK company law
UK public service law

Notes

External links
Explanatory notes to the Utilities Act 2000, from the Office of Public Sector Information.

United Kingdom Acts of Parliament 2000